Jesús Javier de Hoz Bravo (29 July 1940 – 12 January 2019) was a Spanish philologist and  Catedrático (University Professor).

His main areas of research were Paleohispanic languages, historical linguistics, ancient Celtic languages, history of writing, preclassical Greek literature, Greek epigraphy, and ancient Greek theatre.

Biography 
He was Professor at the Universidad de Sevilla (1967–1969), the Universidad de Salamanca (1969–1989), Dean of the Faculty of Philology of the Universidad de Salamanca (1981–1985), Director of the Colegio Trilingüe of Salamanca (1970–1984) and, from 1989 to 2010, Professor in the Universidad Complutense (Department of Greek Philology and Indo-European Studies).

De Hoz served as expert advisor for the UNESCO Central Co-ordinating Committee for the Study of Celtic Cultures (1984–1999), and was a member of the Council of Patronage of the Fundación Pastor de Estudios Clásicos. He also served as the Director of the Project Hesperia for the development of a database for Palaeohispanic data.

Javier de Hoz died on 12 January 2019 at the age of 78.

Works
 (co-edited with Eugenio R. Luján and Patrick Sims-Williams)

Further reading

References

External links
 Professor page at the Universidad Complutense
 Página de Jesús Javier de Hoz Bravo en Dialnet Publications by Jesús Javier de Hoz Bravo in the Dialnet list
 Hesperia. Banco de Datos de Lenguas Paleohispánicas

1940 births
2019 deaths
Linguists from Spain
Spanish philologists
Indo-Europeanists
Linguists of Indo-European languages
Hellenic epigraphers
Celtic epigraphers
Complutense University of Madrid alumni
Complutense University of Madrid
Academic staff of the University of Salamanca
Celtic studies scholars